Far Rockaway Skate Park is a public skate park on the Rockaway Beach and Boardwalk in Far Rockaway, Queens, New York City, opened in 2011. The park is open dawn till dusk and is unsupervised. In addition to skateboarding, scooters and inline skates are permitted. The park was built over a large parking lot that was reduced in size but not eliminated. The skatepark project was part of a larger renovation of O'Donohue Park that began in 2010 and was completed in 2011. The park was designed by SITE Design Group and built by California Skateparks.

Gallery

References

External links 

 Battle at the Beach 2 - Farrockaway Skate park - Clipmode

Parks in Queens, New York
Skateparks in New York City
Skateparks in the United States
Rockaway, Queens